Mithun's Dream Factory is an Indian film studio based in Ooty.

Mithun Chakraborty left the Mumbai based film industry in the early 1990s as he shifted his base to Ooty to concentrate on his hotel business. He set up a hotel in Ooty  and chose to act only in films which were shot at Ooty and nearby locales. This strategy paid off as the film crew could stay in his hotel, the Monarch, for discounted rates, and complete the film in a single schedule.

Chakraborty's limited budget movies soon started flowing, as every month saw a Chakraborty release. These movies were profitable, but were often ignored by critics and were categorized as B movies (low-budget films). He paid more tax than anyone else in the Bollywood film industry in the country between 1995 and 1999.

Chakraborty also holds the record of appearing in the highest number of Hindi films as hero (over 250 films).

Selected filmography

Snippets

India Today Magazine printed an article in which it referred to Chakraborty as "The B movies (low-budget) King". SCREEN Weekly carried a cover story calling him  "Mithun - The Miracle Man", both covering the Ooty-based film production phenomenon. Outlook Magazine mentioned the same. Filmfare Magazine in May 1998 published the same phenomenon under the title "Believe it or not... The unusually - safe suthri story of Mithun Chakraborty". Rediff addressed Chakraborty as "That indefatigable Movie Machine".

Director T L V Prasad made more than 25 Chakraborty films.

References
 http://www.screenindia.com/old/20020315/fcover1.html
 http://www.india-today.com/itoday/09031998/cinema.html
 http://wearethemovies.com/forum/index.php?topic=293.0;wap2

Indian film studios